Clifford Keith Wain Schellenberg (13 March 1929 – 28 October 2019) was a British businessman and Winter Olympian. He was known for his legal disputes related to his ownership of the Scottish island of Eigg. He also stood in the 1964 UK general election in Richmond (Yorks) and the October 1974 UK general election in Moray and Nairn as a Liberal candidate.

Personal life

Schellenberg was the son of Clifford Robertshaw Schellenberg (1898–1971), of Woodlands, The Grove, Marton-in-Cleveland, Yorkshire. His distant forbears hailed from Wurttemberg. He attended Giggleswick School. Schellenberg was a lifelong vegetarian. He became vegetarian after witnessing a friend kill a water rat with a catapult.

He had six children and was married four times; firstly, in 1957, to Jan Hagenbach, with whom he had two daughters; secondly, in 1964, to Margaret de Hauteville Hamilton, daughter of Robert Hamilton-Udny, 11th Lord Belhaven and Stenton, by whom he had a son and two daughters; thirdly, to garden designer Susan "Suki" Minette Urquhart (1944–2014), daughter of Major-General Robert Urquhart, General officer commanding the 1st Airborne Division at the Battle of Arnhem during Operation Market Garden in 1944; and was survived by his widow Jilly. Schellenberg lived at Davidstone House, near Keith, Aberdeenshire, and at Old Mayen on the River Deveron. He encouraged the Scottish Wildlife Trust to create several nature reserves.

He died in Richmond, North Yorkshire in October 2019 at the age of 90.

Winter Olympics and sporting endeavours
Schellenberg competed in the two-man and the four-man Bobsleigh events at the 1956 Winter Olympics. He also competed in the men's singles in the luge at the 1964 Winter Olympics. He also played on the Yorkshire rugby team. In 1968 he competed in the London to Sydney Marathon in his vintage Bentley, retiring when his car toppled off the edge of the road which had subsided under the weight of the car.

Powerboat Racing 

Keith Schellenberg’s love for motor racing and speed spilled over to offshore racing in 1963 when he entered a Bertram hull ‘Glass Moppie’ in the Cowes Torquay for the first time, he finished in second behind the more experienced Sonny Levi.

Schellenberg continued racing throughout the sixties without further success on board ‘Blue Moppie’ and ‘Thunderstreak’, he entered the 1969 Round Britain with ‘Botany Bay Express’ however he was disqualified for having difficulty obtaining radio crystals.

He had asked and been given permission for late arrival to find the crystals, but when he turned up for a certain scrutineering test he was disqualified out of hand without discussion by the Race Committee.

Schellenberg competed in another Round Britain race in 1984 and came out of retirement for the 2008 Cowes Torquay Cowes at the age of 78.

This proved to be a successful race finishing second in Class and 17th overall in a Cougar US-1 monohull ‘Yellow Drama’.

References

1929 births
2019 deaths
20th-century English businesspeople
Bobsledders at the 1956 Winter Olympics
Businesspeople from Yorkshire
English people of German descent
English rugby union players
Lugers at the 1964 Winter Olympics
Olympic bobsledders of Great Britain
Olympic lugers of Great Britain
People educated at Giggleswick School
Rugby union players from Middlesbrough